Nessia gansi, also known commonly as Gans's three-toed snake skink, is a species of lizard in the family Scincidae. The species is endemic to the island of Sri Lanka.

Habitat and distribution
Known localities include Ambalangoda, Kanneliya Forest Reserve, Kottawa, Mount Rumaswala, Imaduwa and Kottawa.

Description
N. gansi has the following characters. The midbody scales are in 22-26 rows. The ventral scales number 103-114. There are 93-105 paravertebral dorsal scales. The snout is acutely pointed. There are four limbs, and each limb has three digits. The dorsum is dark brown, with each dorsal scale having a distinct posterior dark spot, and the venter is dusky brown.

Ecology
N. gansi prefers damp forests or home gardens. In home gardens, it is found in loose soil, in leaf debris, close to rubbish heaps.

Reproduction
N. gansi is oviparous.

Etymology
The specific name, gansi, is in honour of American herpetologist Carl Gans.

References

Further reading
Batuwita S, Edirisinghe U (2017). "Nessia gansi: a Second Three-toed Snake-Skink (Reptilia: Squamata: Scincidae) from Sri Lanka with the Designation of a Neotype for Nessia burtonii Gray. Travaux du Muséum National d’Histoire Naturelle «Grigore Antipa» 60 (1): 377–388. (Nessia gansi, new species).

Reptiles of Sri Lanka
Nessia
Reptiles described in 2017